The Quilombola are an ethnic minority in Brazil. They live in closed communities, called quilombos. They trace back from slaves (mostly Angolan), brought to Brazil in the seventeenth century.
One of their leaders was Chico Rei, a Congolese king captured and sold as a slave to a gold mine in Minas Gerais. He was the first to create a free quilombo.

The word Quilombo comes from the Angolan word kilombo, which means "different."

The quilombo was based on the African way of life, an African-European language was adopted and the religion they followed was a mixture of Christianity with African influences.

As they had to fight for their existence ever since their establishment (against slave traders, the Dutch, the Portuguese, and Brazilian government), they keep closed, and their establishments are not freely accessible (because of Brazilian administration too).

Quilombo's exist (but are not limited to) in Manqueira, Ilha de Mare.

External links
 Wds-Worldbank

Ethnic groups in Brazil